Mirza Mohammad-Ali Khorasani Sanglakh (birthdate unknown - died 3 March 1877), also known as Mirza Sanglakh, was a celebrated Iranian calligrapher and stone carver of the 19th century. He was also a poet and author. Sanglakh flourished during the reign of three successive Iranian monarchs; Fath-Ali Shah Qajar, Mohammad Shah Qajar and Naser al-Din Shah Qajar. He was born in Quchan and died in Tabriz.

Sources 
 

Iranian calligraphers
19th-century Iranian artists
1877 deaths
People from Razavi Khorasan Province
19th-century Iranian writers
People from Quchan